John Brisker (June 15, 1947 – declared dead May 29, 1985) was an American professional basketball player who disappeared on April 11, 1978 after allegedly visiting Uganda. He played college basketball for the Toledo Rockets until he left the team during his senior season in 1968. Brisker began his professional career with the Pittsburgh Pipers / Condors of the American Basketball Association (ABA) where he was a two-time ABA All-Star. He played for the Seattle SuperSonics of the National Basketball Association (NBA) from 1972 to 1975. Brisker finished his career with the Cherry Hill Rookies of the Eastern Basketball Association (EBA) in 1975.

Brisker allegedly travelled to Uganda in 1978 where he disappeared after last making contact with his girlfriend on April 11, 1978. He was declared dead on May 29, 1985, to settle his estate but his final movements are unknown and his death was doubted by the State Department.

Career
A 6'5" forward/guard who played for the Toledo Rockets basketball team of the University of Toledo, Brisker played six seasons in the ABA and NBA as a member of the Pittsburgh Pipers (1969–1970), Pittsburgh Condors (1970–1972) and Seattle SuperSonics (1972–1975). He averaged 20.7 points per game over the course of his ABA/NBA career (26.1 points per game in the ABA, and 11.9 points per game in the NBA).

Brisker developed a reputation as one of the most volatile players in basketball. According to his Condors teammate Charlie Williams, "He was an excellent player, but say something wrong to the guy and you had this feeling he would reach into his bag, take out a gun and shoot you." He was ejected so often for fighting that he was nicknamed "the heavyweight champion of the ABA." The Condors made much of Brisker's reputation as an enforcer; their media guide portrayed him wearing a pair of six-shooters.

In a 1971 game against the Denver Rockets, Brisker was ejected two minutes into the game for an elbow on the Rockets' Art Becker. Brisker charged back onto the court three times in order to go after Becker. A group of police officers threatened to arrest Brisker and finally persuaded him to return to the locker room.

Disappearance
In March 1978, Brisker travelled to Uganda to launch an "import-export business". The last confirmed communication from Brisker was on April 11, 1978, when he called his girlfriend in Seattle.

It is unknown what happened to Brisker. His former SuperSonics teammates have speculated that he was killed while fighting as a mercenary or shot in an argument with Ugandan royalty. He was declared dead in absentia on May 29, 1985 by the medical examiner of King County for the purpose of settling his estate. However, the State Department could not confirm that Brisker had travelled to Africa; a spokesperson stated that "essentially, we don't consider him dead."

Personal life
Brisker had a daughter.

See also

List of people who disappeared

Notes

External links
Detroit Mercy: The Hard Life and Mysterious Death of John Brisker
RememberTheABA.com John Brisker page

1947 births
1970s missing person cases
1978 deaths
20th-century African-American sportspeople
African-American basketball players
American expatriates in Uganda
American men's basketball players
Basketball players from Detroit
Missing people
Missing person cases in Uganda
People declared dead in absentia
People from Hamtramck, Michigan
Pittsburgh Condors players
Pittsburgh Pipers players
Seattle SuperSonics players
Shooting guards
Small forwards
Sportspeople from Wayne County, Michigan
Toledo Rockets men's basketball players
Undrafted National Basketball Association players